Thorectes hispanus is a species of beetle in the Geotrupidae family. It is endemic to areas of Spain and Portugal.

References

Beetles described in 1892